The UTC clade is a grouping of green algae.

It includes Ulvophyceae, Trebouxiophyceae and Chlorophyceae.

References

Green algae